The Venice Challenge Save Cup is a tennis tournament held in Mestre, Italy since 2014. The event is part of the ATP Challenger Tour and is played on outdoor clay courts.

Past finals

Singles

Doubles

External links
, Official website